The Look of Love may refer to:

Songs 
 "The Look of Love" (1967 song), a popular song written by Burt Bacharach and Hal David
 "The Look of Love" (ABC song), 1982
 "The Look of Love" (Madonna song), 1987
 "Look of Love" (Lesley Gore song), 1964
 "The Look of Love", a song by Frank Sinatra from Softly, as I Leave You

Albums 
 The Look of Love (Claudine Longet album), 1967
 The Look of Love (Diana Krall album), 2001
 The Look of Love (Dusty Springfield album), 1967
 The Look of Love (Stanley Turrentine album), 1968
 The Look of Love (Trijntje Oosterhuis album), 2006
 Look of Love: The Very Best of ABC, a 2001 compilation album by ABC
 The Look of Love (Vivian Dandridge album), by Vivian Dandridge

Other 
 The Look of Love (musical), a musical revue featuring Bacharach-David songs
 The Look of Love (film), a 2013 UK film starring Steve Coogan
 The Look of Love was the working title of the 2013 film The Face of Love, starring Annette Bening and Ed Harris